Altuna may refer to:

Altuna Runestone, a Viking Age memorial runestone 
Altuna Sejdiu, Albanian-Macedonian singer-songwriter, known professionally as Tuna
Fernando Bengoetxea Altuna, known as Pernando Amezketarra 
Horacio Altuna (born 1941), Argentinian comics artist
Jon Altuna (born 1980), Spanish footballer
Tuna Altuna (born 1989), Turkish tennis player

See also

Altona (disambiguation)
Altoona (disambiguation)
Antuna